Levin Handy may refer to:

 Levin Corbin Handy (ca. 1855–1932), American photographer
 L. Irving Handy (1861–1922), American educator, lawyer and politician